ASCII, the American Standard Code for Information Interchange.

ASCII may also refer to:
 ASCII (company), a Japanese publisher later merged to ASCII Media Works and Enterbrain
 ASCII (magazine), a Japanese personal computer magazine
 ASCII (squat),  Dutch computing project
 ASCII, asteroid 3568 ASCII
 ASCII, the second release of Linux distribution Devuan

See also 
 Extended ASCII
 ASCII art
 ASCII game, text-based game
 ASCII armor, redirects to binary-to-text encoding
 Arthur Askey